Jorge Mayer (20 November 1915 – 25 December 2010) was the Roman Catholic Archbishop of the Archdiocese of Bahía Blanca, Argentina from 1972 to 1991.

Biography
Mayer was born in San Miguel Arcángel, Adolfo Alsina Partido, Buenos Aires Province; he was of Volga German descent. Ordained a priest on 24 March 1940, he was named bishop of the Diocese of Santa Rosa, La Pampa Province, on 9 July 1957. On 31 May 1972 Pope Paul VI appointed him Archbishop of Bahía Blanca, succeeding Germiniano Esorto.

He took over in a formal Mass on 21 July 1972 until he resigned to his Pastoral task on 31 May 1991, upon turning 80 years of age, as established by the Pope. He was succeeded by Rómulo García, becoming then Archbishop Emeritus, where he continued working actively , despite his age. Mayer spoke both Spanish and German, as well as Italian, among other languages. During the 1980s and 1990s he led many groups of pilgrims from Bahía Blanca to Israel.

See also

 Roman Catholicism in Argentina

References
 
 

1915 births
2010 deaths
20th-century Roman Catholic archbishops in Argentina
People from Buenos Aires Province
Argentine people of Volga German descent
Participants in the Second Vatican Council
Place of death missing
Roman Catholic archbishops of Bahía Blanca
Roman Catholic bishops of Santa Rosa in Argentina